Switzerland has participated in the biennial classical music competition Eurovision Young Musicians 12 times since its debut in 1982, most recently taking part in 2006. Switzerland have hosted the contest twice, in 1984 and 2004.

Participation overview

Hostings

See also
Switzerland in the Eurovision Song Contest
Switzerland in the Eurovision Dance Contest
Switzerland in the Junior Eurovision Song Contest

References

External links 
 Eurovision Young Musicians

Countries in the Eurovision Young Musicians